Hasdeo River is the largest tributary of Mahanadi River. The river flows in the state of Chhattisgarh. It joins Mahanadi River near Shiladehi (Birra). Hasdeo Bango Dam is constructed across this river. The major tributary of Hasdeo River is Gej River. The river flows through the Hasdeo Arand forest.

See also 
 Amritdhara falls
 Chirmiri
 Tourism in Chhattisgarh

References

External links 
Hasdeo river merging with Mahanadi in wikimapia

 Rivers of Chhattisgarh
 Tributaries of the Mahanadi River
 Rivers of India 22222